Aleksandr Aleksandrovich Khanov, ( in Saint Petersburg – 30 August 1983 in Moscow) was a Soviet and Russian stage and film actor. People's Artist of the USSR (1973).

 He was awarded the Stalin Prize three times (1941, 1947, 1949).

Filmography
 Minin and Pozharsky (1939) – Kuzma Minin
 Suvorov (1941) – Platonych
The Train Goes East (1947) – Dining car passenger (uncredited)
 The Fall of Berlin (1950) – Nikolai Aleksandrovich Bulganin
Far from Moscow (1950) – Kuzma Kuzmich Topolev
Silvery Dust (1953) – Charles Armstrong
May Stars (1959) – General Sergei
The Salvos of the Aurora Cruiser (1965) – Ambassador
Royal Regatta (1966) – Aleksei Ivanovich, Vasya's grandfather
Late Flowers (1970) – Nikifor the valet
The Polynin Case (1970) – Balakirev Sr.
The Humpbacked Horse (1975 version) – Miracle Fish-whale (voice)

References

External links 
 

1904 births
1981 deaths
Male actors from Saint Petersburg
Honored Artists of the RSFSR
People's Artists of the RSFSR
People's Artists of the USSR
Stalin Prize winners
Russian male film actors
Russian male stage actors
Russian male voice actors
Soviet male film actors
Soviet male stage actors
Soviet male voice actors
Burials at Vagankovo Cemetery